Los Tarcos Rugby Club, is a rugby union team from San Miguel de Tucumán, Argentina. 

The rugby union team is member of the Unión de Rugby de Tucumán and one of the most successful teams in the province, having won the provincial title 12 times and having reached the final of the Nacional de Clubes once. Many Tarcos players went on to represent Argentina at international level, including Luis Molina, Marcelo Ricci, Pablo and Fernando Buabse, Sergio Bunader and Leonardo Gravano.  
L.T.R.C 2004  M-12 2016

History
Los Tarcos Rugby Club was founded on 4 January 1955, and used public parks for the first years of its existence. The club had to wait until 1986 to get their own installations.

Titles
Torneo del Noroeste (14): 1966, 1967, 1969, 1975, 1976, 1983, 1984, 1985, 1986, 1987, 1994, 2004, 2016, 2018

References

External links
Official Twitter

Tarcos
Tarcos
Tarcos
Tarcos
1955 establishments in Argentina